Ronny Surma (born 17 April 1988) is a German retired footballer.

References

External links
 

1988 births
Living people
German footballers
Dynamo Dresden II players
SV Babelsberg 03 players
Sportfreunde Lotte players
1. FC Lokomotive Leipzig players
Hannover 96 II players
3. Liga players
Regionalliga players
Association football central defenders
Footballers from Dresden